Micrasta is a genus of beetles in the family Buprestidae, containing the following species:

 Micrasta alvarengai Cobos, 1959
 Micrasta amplithorax Kerremans, 1893
 Micrasta bucki Cobos, 1961
 Micrasta creola Obenberger, 1936
 Micrasta cubensis Fisher, 1930
 Micrasta cyanipennis Kerremans, 1893
 Micrasta fisheri Théry, 1927
 Micrasta gyleki Obenberger, 1917
 Micrasta hispaniolae Fisher, 1940
 Micrasta meligethoides Kerremans, 1893
 Micrasta minuta Kerremans, 1896
 Micrasta monticola Fisher, 1940
 Micrasta negrei Cobos, 1961
 Micrasta oakleyi Fisher, 1935
 Micrasta ornata Fisher, 1935
 Micrasta parallela Kerremans, 1896
 Micrasta peruviana Fisher, 1949
 Micrasta puertoricensis Fisher, 1940
 Micrasta pygmaeola Obenberger, 1917
 Micrasta strandi Obenberger, 1936
 Micrasta subcylindrica Fisher, 1940
 Micrasta typica Kerremans, 1893
 Micrasta uniformis (Waterhouse, 1896)
 Micrasta viridis Kerremans, 1896

References

Buprestidae genera